The Last Poets are several groups of poets and musicians who arose from the late 1960s African-American civil rights movement's black nationalism. The name is taken from a poem by the South African revolutionary poet Keorapetse Kgositsile, who believed he was in the last era of poetry before guns would take over. The original users of that name were the trio of Abiodun Oyewole, Gylan Kain, and David Nelson.

The versions of the group led by Jalaluddin Mansur Nuriddin and Umar Bin Hassan had the largest impact on popular culture. The Last Poets were one of the earliest influences on hip-hop music. Critic Jason Ankeny wrote: "With their politically charged raps, taut rhythms, and dedication to raising African-American consciousness, the Last Poets almost single-handedly laid the groundwork for the emergence of hip-hop." The British music magazine NME stated, "Serious spokesmen like Gil Scott-Heron, The Last Poets, and later Gary Byrd, paved the way for the many socially committed Black [emcees] a decade later."

History

Origins and 1970s
Jalal Mansur Nuriddin a.k.a. Alafia Pudim, Umar Bin Hassan, and Abiodun Oyewole, along with poet Sulaiman El-Hadi and percussionist Nilaja Obabi (Raymond "Mac" Hurrey), are generally considered the best-known members of the various lineups. Jalal, Umar, and Nilaja appeared on the group's 1970 self-titled debut LP and follow-up This Is Madness. Nilija then left, and a third poet, Sulaiman El-Hadi, was added. This Jalal-Sulaiman version of the group made six albums together but recorded only sporadically without much promotion after 1977.

The Original Last Poets were formed on 19 May 1968, the birthday of Malcolm X, at Mount Morris Park (now known as Marcus Garvey Park) in East Harlem, New York City. The original group consisted of Gylan Kain, David Nelson and Abiodun Oyewole. The group coalesced via a 1969 Harlem writers' workshop known as East Wind. On 24 October that year, the group performed on pioneering New York television program Soul!. 
The Last Poets contributed "Wake Up, Niggers" to the soundtrack of Performance, a 1970 film featuring Mick Jagger. 

When Nelson left, he was replaced by Felipe Luciano, who would later leave to establish the Young Lords. When Kain and Nelson began to pursue other interests (theater and ministry respectively), Abiodun Oyewole "recruited" Alafia Pudim (later known as Jalaluddin Mansur) and Umar bin Hassan. Following the success of the newly refigured Last Poets first album, founding members Kain and Nelson got together with Luciano and recorded their only album Right On in 1970, the soundtrack to a documentary movie of the same name that finally saw release in 1971.  Luciano, Kain, Abiodune Oyewole and Nelson recorded separately as The Original Last Poets, gaining some renown as the soundtrack artists (without Oyewole) of the 1971 film Right On!Following a legal battle between the two groups concerning ownership of the band's name, The Right On album was released under the group name The Original Last Poets to simultaneously establish the founding members' primacy and distance themselves from the other group of the same name. 

In 1972, they appeared on Black Forum Records album Black Spirits - Festival Of New Black Poets In America with "And See Her Image In The River" and "Song of Ditla, part II", recorded live at the Apollo Theatre, Harlem, New York.  A book of the same name was published by Random House (1972 - ).

Having reached US Top 10 chart success with its debut album, the Last Poets went on to release the follow-up, This Is Madness, without then-incarcerated Abiodun Oyewole. The album featured more politically charged poetry that resulted in the group being listed under the counter-intelligence program COINTELPRO during the Richard Nixon administration. Hassan left the group following This Is Madness to be replaced by Sulaiman El-Hadi in time for Chastisment (1972). The album introduced a sound the group called "jazzoetry", leaving behind the spare percussion of the previous albums in favor of a blending of jazz and funk instrumentation with poetry. The music further developed into free-jazz–poetry with Hassan's brief return on Blue Thumb album At Last (1973), as yet the only Last Poets release still unavailable on CD.

The remainder of the 1970s saw a decline in the group's popularity in America, although they became quite popular in Europe.

1980s and 1990s
In the 1980s and beyond, however, the group gained renown with the rise of hip-hop music, often being name-checked as grandfathers and founders of the new movement, often citing the Jalaluddin solo project Hustler's Convention (1973) as their inspiration. Because of this the band was interviewed in the 1986 cult documentary Big Fun In The Big Town. Nuriddin and El-Hadi worked on several projects under the Last Poets name, working with bassist and producer Bill Laswell, including 1984's Oh My People and 1988's  Freedom Express, and recording the final El Hadi–Nuriddin collaboration, Scatterrap/Home, in 1994.  The group, El Hadi, Nuriddin and Hassan, also made a guest appearance in John Singleton's 1993 film Poetic Justice. Prominent Attorney Gregory J Reed reunited Original Poets in NY the same day of Nelson Mandela was released from prison after 27 years and recorded "Poets Live" in Detroit's Orchestra Hall, and produced "The Return of the Original Last Poets Docudrama"  Kain, Luciano, Oyewole and Nelson after 20 years in 1990.

Sulaiman El-Hadi died in October 1995. Oyewole and Hassan began recording separately under the same name, releasing Holy Terror in 1995 (re-released on Innerhythmic in 2004) and Time Has Come in 1997. Meanwhile, Nuriddin released the solo CD's On The One (1996), The Fruits of Rap (1997) and Science Friction (2004) under the abbreviated name "Jalal."

21st century
In 2005, the Last Poets found fame again refreshed through a collaboration where the trio (Umar Bin Hassan) was featured with hip-hop artist Common on the Kanye West-produced song "The Corner," as well as (Abiodun Oyewole) with the Wu-Tang Clan-affiliated political hip-hop group Black Market Militia on the song "The Final Call," stretching overseas to the UK on songs "Organic Liquorice (Natural Woman)", "Voodoocore", and "A Name" with Shaka Amazulu the 7th. The group is also featured on the Nas album Untitled, on the songs "You Can't Stop Us Now" and "Project Roach." Individual members of the group also collaborated with DST on a remake of "Mean Machine", Public Enemy on a remake of "White Man's Got A God Complex" and with  Bristol-based post-punk band the Pop Group.

In 2010, Abiodun Oyowele was among the artists featured on the Welfare Poets' produced Cruel And Unusual Punishment, a CD compilation that was made in protest of the death penalty, which also featured some several current positive hip hop artists.

In 2004 Jalal Mansur Nuriddin, a.k.a. Alafia Pudim, a.k.a. Lightning Rod (The Hustlers Convention 1973), collaborated with the UK-based poet Mark T. Watson (a.k.a. Malik Al Nasir) writing the foreword to Watson's debut poetry collection, Ordinary Guy, published in December 2004 by the Liverpool-based publisher Fore-Word Press. Jalal's foreword was written in rhyme, and was recorded for a collaborative album "Rhythms of the Diaspora (Vol. 1 & 2 - Unreleased) by Malik Al Nasir's band, Malik & the O.G's featuring Gil Scott-Heron, percussionist Larry McDonald, drummers Rod Youngs and Swiss Chris, New York dub poet Ras Tesfa, and a host of young rappers from New York and Washington, D.C. Produced by Malik Al Nasir, and Swiss Chris, the albums Rhythms of the Diaspora; Vol. 1 & 2 are the first of their kind to unite these pioneers of poetry and hip hop with each other.

In 2011, Abiodun Oyewole and Umar Bin Hassan performed at The Jazz Cafe in London, in a tribute concert to the late  Scott-Heron and all the former Last Poets. In 2014, Nuriddin performed at the same venue with Jazz Warriors, the first live performance in 40 years of the "Hustlers Convention". The event was produced by Fore-Word Press and featured Liverpool poet Malik Al Nasir with his band Malik & the O.G's featuring Cleveland Watkiss, Orphy Robinson and Tony Remy. The event was filmed as part of a documentary on the "Hustlers Convention" by Manchester film maker Mike Todd and Riverhorse Communications. The executive producer was Public Enemy's Chuck D. As part of the event Charly Records re-issued a special limited edition of the vinyl version of Hustlers Convention to celebrate their 40th anniversary. The event was MC'd by poet Lemn Sissay and the DJ was Shiftless Shuffle's Perry Louis.

In 2016, The Last Poets (World Editions, UK), was published. The novel, written by Christine Otten , was originally published in Dutch in 2011, and has now been translated by Jonathan Reeder for English readers.

In May 2018, The Last Poets released Understand What Black Is, their first album since 1997. The album featured tributes to late artists Prince and Biggie Smalls.

Discography

Albums
The Last Poets (1970) - Re-issue Celluloid Records (1984) (Cat No: CELL-6101)
 (Poets: Abiodun Oyewole, Alafia Pudim (a.k.a. Jalaluddin Mansur Nuriddin), & Umar Bin Hassan/Percussionist: Raymond "Nilaja/Obabi" Hurrey)
The Original Last Poets - Right On Original Soundtrack (1971) Juggernaut Records
 (Poets: Felipe Luciano, David Nelson & Gylan Kain)
This Is Madness (March 1971) Douglas Records Douglas-7 (Cat No: Z-30583)
 (Poets: Alafia Pudim (a.k.a. Jalaluddin Mansur Nuriddin) & Umar Bin Hassan/Percussionist: Raymond "Nilaja/Obabi" Hurrey)
Black Spirits - Festival Of New Black Poets In America (1972) Black Forum Records B-456-L 
 (Poets: Felipe Luciano, David Nelson & Gylan Kain [spelt Cain])
Chastisement (July 1972)
 (Poets: Alafia Pudim (a.k.a. Jalaluddin Mansur Nuriddin) & Sulaiman El-Hadi/Percussionist: Raymond "Nilaja/Obabi" Hurrey)
Hustlers Convention (1973)
 (Poet: Lightnin' Rod (a.k.a. Alafia Pudim & Jalaluddin Mansur Nuriddin) 
At Last (1973)
 (Poets: Jalaluddin Mansur Nuriddin, Sulaiman El-Hadi, & Umar Bin Hassan)
Jazzoetry (Compilation) album (1976) Douglas Records Casablanca records (Cat No: ADLP 6001. - Spoet Publishing - BMI)
 (Poets: Jalaluddin Mansur Nuriddin, Abiodun Oyewole & Umar Bin Hassan)
Delights of the Garden (1977)
 (Poets: Jalaluddin Mansur Nuriddin & Sulaiman El-Hadi)
Oh My People (1984)
 (Poets: Sulaiman El-Hadi & Jalaluddin Mansur Nuriddin)
This Is Madness (Re-issue) (1984) (Celluloid Records)
 (Poets: Alafia Pudim, Umar Bin Hassen; Percussion: Raymond "Nilija/Obabi" Hurrey)
Freedom Express (1988)
 (Poets: Sulaiman El-Hadi & Jalaluddin Mansur Nuriddin)
Retro Fit (Compilation) (1992)
 (Poets: Sulaiman & Jalaluddin Mansur Nuriddin)
Holy Terror (1993)
 (Poets: Abiodun Oyewole & Umar Bin Hassan)
Scatterap / Home (1994)
 (Poets: Sulaiman El-Hadi & Jalaluddin Mansur Nuriddin)
Time Has Come (Mouth Almighty Records 1997)
 (Poets: Abiodun Oyewole & Umar Bin Hassan)
The Prime Time Rhyme of The Last Poets - Best Of Vol. 1 (1999) On The One Records  (Cat No: SPOA-21LP)
 (Poets: Sulaiman El-Hadi & Jalaluddin Mansur Nuriddin)
The Prime Time Rhyme of The Last Poets - Best Of Vol. 2 (1999) On The One Records
 (Poets: Sulaiman El-Hadi & Jalaluddin Mansur Nuriddin)
Understand What Black Is (2018)
 (Poets: Abiodun Oyewole & Umar Bin Hassan)
Transcending Toxic Times (2019)
 (Poets: Abiodun Oyewole & Umar Bin Hassan & Baba Donn Babatunde)

Appearances
American Sahara - SmCity, "Dream Cemetery" (2013)
Hip-Hop samit sharma Docktrine - The Official Boondocks Mixtape (2006)
Rhythms of the Diaspora Vol. 1 & 2 Featuring Gil Scott-Heron & The Last Poets (album)|Rhythms of the Diaspora Vol. 1 & 2 (2015) Mentis Records.
(Poets: Jalaluddin Mansur Nuriddin, Malik Al Nasir, Ras Tesfa, Gil Scott-Heron)
The Corner - Common, "Be" (2005)
Project Roach & You Can't Stop Us Now - Nas, "Untitled" (2008)
Made in Amerikkka  - Reuniting The Last Poets  (2008)
Poetic Justice (1993)Excursions - A Tribe Called Quest, "The Low End Theory" (1991)Discipline 99 Pt. 0 - Quasimoto, "The Unseen" (2000)Return of The Last Poets 1990 [ Original Founding members,Kain,Lupe,Abiodune and Nelson]

Bibliography
Vibes from the Scribes - Pluto Press, 1985
On a Mission - Henry Holt Pub., 1996

Filmography
1970 - "Tamu". Directed by Larry Clark. - "Two Little Boys" included in soundtrack. Los Angeles, California, 1970
1971 - Right On!: Poetry on Film (Original Last Poets). Directed by Herbert Danska.
2008 - The Last Poets, made in Amerikkka (réalisation: Claude Santiago. France, 2008. www.lahuit.com).
2004 - Word-Up!: From Ghetto to Mecca Jalal Mansur Nuriddin, Gil Scott-Heron, Malik Al Nasir, Benjamin Zephaniah. Directed by Shirani Sabaratnam. Liverpool, UK
2014 - Hustlers Convention (Feature Documentary Film) Jalal Mansur Nuriddin, Chuck D, Malik Al Nasir, Ice-T, Immortal Technique, Alan Douglas (record producer), Sonia Sanchez, Melle Mel, Fab Five Freddy Directed by Mike Todd. Manchester, UK
1990-" The Return of Original members of Last Poets Docudrama after 20 years of separation producer atty Gregory J Reed

See also

The Watts Prophets
Malik & the O.G's
 Rapping

References

External links
 Interview with The Last Poets in November 2008, World Tracks, Radio France International
 Fore-Word Press
 Roots'n'Rap: The Last Poets
 Jalal Mansur Nuriddin's website
 Umar Bin Hassan's website
 Last Poets Tribute album at Jambetta Music
 
 The Last Poets' page at Celluloid Records

American spoken word poets
African-American poets
American poets
Musical groups established in 1968
Mercury Records artists
Blue Thumb Records artists
Poets from New York (state)
1968 establishments in New York City